Eisāgi is a village in Rušona Parish, Preiļi Municipality in the Latgale region of Latvia. It is a home of the famous Latgalian ceramicists, such as Augusts Zagorskis. It is located 213 kilometers from the capital city of Latvia, Riga. It has a population of 5 (2020).

History 
Towards the end of 19th century, pottery craft was common in Eisāgi village. Renowned Latgalian ceramicists, the Zagorski family members: Augusts Zagorskis, Julians Zagorskis and Vaclavs Zagorskis were born in Eisāgi.

Geography 
Eisāgi is located close to the Salmejs lake nearby neighboring Gaiļmuiža. Village is 173 meters above the sea level and it is located in the western part of the Latgale Upland.

References 

Towns and villages in Latvia
Preiļi Municipality
Latgale